Lev Mikhailovich Karakhan (Karakhanian) Armenian  Լևոն Միքայելի Կարախանյան, Russian Лев Михайлович Карахан (20 January 1889, Tiflis – 20 September 1937, Moscow) was a Russian revolutionary and a Soviet diplomat. A member of the RSDLP from 1904. At first a Menshevik, he joined the Bolsheviks in May 1917.

In October 1917, he was member of the Revolutionary Military Council; then served as secretary of the Soviet delegation at the Brest-Litovsk peace talks together with Leon Trotsky and Adolph Joffe. In 1918-1920 and 1927–1934, he was the Deputy People's Commissar for Foreign Affairs. In 1919, he issued a statement concerning relations with China called the Karakhan Manifesto. In 1921, he was the Soviet Ambassador to Poland; in 1923–1926, the Ambassador to China; after 1934, the Ambassador to Turkey.

Karakhan was known for his dandyish appearance; Karl Radek is quoted as having "maliciously described" him as "the Ass of Classical Beauty",  while a junior colleague, Alexander Barmine, wrote that "Our young staff gave him unstinted admiration, amazed that humanity could produce such perfection. He had a purity of profile such as is seen, as a rule, only on ancient coins." The British diplomat Robert Bruce Lockhart, who met Karakhan in 1918, described him as:

On May 3, 1937 Karakhan was recalled to Moscow and arrested on charges of participating in a "pro-fascist conspiracy" to overthrow the Soviet Government.

On September 20, 1937, he was sentenced to death by the Military Collegium of the Supreme Court. He was shot on the same day and became a victim of the Great Purge.

Karakhan was posthumously rehabilitated in 1956.

His third wife (in civil marriage), Marina Semyonova, the Soviet ballet dancer, died in 2010.

References

External links
Britannica article about Karakhan Manifesto
 

1889 births
1937 deaths
Diplomats from Tbilisi
People from Tiflis Governorate
Georgian people of Armenian descent
Mensheviks
Mezhraiontsy
Old Bolsheviks
Central Committee of the Communist Party of the Soviet Union members
Ambassadors of the Soviet Union to China
Ambassadors of the Soviet Union to Turkey
Ambassadors of the Soviet Union to Poland
Armenian revolutionaries
Armenian atheists
Executive Committee of the Communist International
Treaty of Brest-Litovsk negotiators
Tomsk State University alumni
Great Purge victims from Armenia
Armenian people executed by the Soviet Union
Soviet rehabilitations
Russian revolutionaries
Members of the Communist Party of the Soviet Union executed by the Soviet Union